Shuttleworth & Ingersoll P.L.C. is a law firm located in Cedar Rapids, Iowa. It has been called one of the oldest legal firms in the western United States and in 2012 was considered one of the largest law firms in Iowa.

History 
The company has its roots in the 1854 law firm of Nathaniel M. Hubbard  whose early partners included Frank Dawley (1865-1922), Charles Wheeler (1851-1927)  and Justice John M. Grimm (1866-1943). Owen N. Elliot (1886-1982) was a member of the firm from 1911 until his retirement in 1958. The firm was called Grimm, Wheeler & Elliot beginning in 1911 and later became Grimm, Wheeler, Elliott and Shuttleworth. T.M. (Ty) Ingersoll (1902-1972) and V. Craven Shuttleworth (1900-1964) joined the firm in the 1920s.  Grimm, Wheeler and Elliot became Elliot, Shuttleworth and Ingersoll in 1945.  Robert O. Daniel (1914-1992) was associated with the firm for 52 years. He remained active in his practice at the firm, until his death in 1992.

The company became Shuttleworth & Ingersoll in 1983.  Six lawyers left a rival firm to join Shuttleworth and Ingersoll in 1998 and the firm became a professional limited liability company in 1999. The company's president is Brian Bergstrom.

Services 
The firm provides tax, estate, commercial and litigation services including services to the wind energy industry. These activities are divided into four areas: business, intellectual property, family law and litigation.

Reception
In 2014 the firm was ranked as one of the best Iowa law firms by U.S. News & World Report. Shuttleworth & Ingersoll reports it was listed as one of Fortune Magazine's Top Ranked Law Firms in 2012. The firm was awarded the Outstanding Philanthropic Organization by the National Society of Fundraising Executives and received the Edge of Excellence Award for Community Service from Edge Business Magazine in 2006. According to The Gazette in Cedar Rapids the firm's employees "are active with just about every non-profit group in the Corridor."

References

External links
 

Law firms based in Iowa
Intellectual property law firms